Adrian Ion Gheorghiu (born 30 November 1981) is a Romanian professional footballer who plays for Liga IV-Bacău County side Viitorul Curița. He is a right footed and plays as a left winger, but lately he played as a right winger.
He is a technical skilled player, one of the few Romanian players with this skills.

Club career
He started his career in the 3rd Romanian division Laminorul Roman, where he played until 2002. He attracted interest, since then because of his skills. After a short spell in Dărmăneşti, he signed with the Liga II Romanian side Petrolul Moineşti, where he stayed for almost a year. He was one of the top scorers, and he brought attention from the Liga I teams.

FCM Bacău 
He signed a four-year contract with FCM Bacău in the 2004 summer. He established himself quickly in the first team, because of his technique. He made his Liga I debut, on 1 August in a 1–0 win against Oţelul Galaţi. He scored his first goal, on 28 August in a 2–1 win against Romanian giant Rapid, scoring in the 83rd minute. He managed to play in almost all games that season, and scored two goals. In his second season in Liga I, he was one of the few players who managed to impress after a terrible season for his team, who finished the last in the table, with only 14 points.

SC Vaslui 
After FCM Bacău's relegation, all the players were on the transfer list. Despite Gheorghiu's next destination supposed to be Ceahlăul, he eventually signed a four-year contract with SC Vaslui. The reported fee paid, is 500.000 €, fee paid for him, and for another FCM Bacău players such as: Doboş, Mardare, Apostol and Neagu. He made his debut for his new team on 29 July, in a 0–0 draw against U Craiova. He scored his first goal on 19 August, on a 3–1 loss against Steaua. His second goal, was right in the next Match Day, where he managed to bring three vital points for his team. He was the second top scorer for his team, with 7 goals. In the second season, because of the captain Frunză's comeback, Gheorghiu started playing on the right side. Even this season wasn't as good as the previous, he still was an important player for his team, who achieved its goal, qualifying for a European competition. His third season, started with Gheorghiu only as a substitute, because of Aliută's come in Vaslui. On 11 April, he had an incredible bad luck. After establishing himself in the first team, he suffered a knee injury, and he stayed out for almost six months. His comeback was on 13 December, when he substituted Gerlem in the 80th minute. Unfortunately for him, he suffered another injury, so he had to stay out for another four months. His comeback at the end of the season, was benefic for his team who finished 3rd in the table, this being the highest rank for a Moldavian club in Liga I. He also started in the first team, in the Romanian Cup final, where he lost it at the penalty shootout.

Statistics 

Statistics accurate as of match played 27 February 2016

Career honours

SC Vaslui 

 Cupa României
 Runner-up: 2010
UEFA Intertoto Cup
Winner: 2008

External links
 
 
 

1981 births
Living people
People from Roman, Romania
Romanian footballers
Association football midfielders
Liga I players
Liga II players
FCM Bacău players
FC Vaslui players
CSM Ceahlăul Piatra Neamț players
CS Aerostar Bacău players